Kimbridge is a small village and civil parish in the Test Valley district of Hampshire, England. Its nearest town is Romsey, which lies approximately 4 miles (6.3 km) south-east. Originally called "King's Bridge" in Civil War times. According to the 2011 census, the population was approximately 144. It consists mainly of a Farm Shop and Restaurant ("Annies") and a trout farm. Most of the area is owned and managed by Kimbridge Estates, but there are a small number of private houses - including a large mansion on the water's edge. The bridge itself is on some of the best fishing waterway in the country. The Test Way long-distance footpath passes through the village, as does the Cardiff-Southampton railway.

Villages in Hampshire
Test Valley